Christian Haller (born 28 October 1989) is a Swiss snowboarder. He competed in the FIS Snowboarding World Championships 2013 – Men's halfpipe. He is a participant in the 2014 Winter Olympics in Sochi.

References

External links
 
 
 
 

1989 births
Snowboarders at the 2010 Winter Olympics
Snowboarders at the 2014 Winter Olympics
Living people
Olympic snowboarders of Switzerland
Swiss male snowboarders